Dragana may refer to:

Dragana (given name), a female given name
Dragana, Bulgaria, a village in Ugarchin Municipality